

Seeds

  Wang Hao (world champion)
  Ma Lin (semifinals)
  Ma Long (semifinals)
  Wang Liqin (final)
  Vladimir Samsonov (second round)
  Chen Qi (quarterfinals)
  Joo Se Hyuk (quarterfinals)
  Chuang Chih-Yuan (second round)
  Ryu Seung Min (second round)
  Oh Sang Eun (second round)
  Li Ching (fourth round)
  Cheung Yuk(fourth round)
  Dimitrij Ovtcharov (fourth round)
  Michael Maze (quarterfinals)
  Jörgen Persson (third round)
  Jiang Tianyi (fourth round)
  Zoran Primorac (third round)
  Jun Mizutani (fourth round)
  Kan Yo (second round)
  Gao Ning (second round)
  Chen Weixing (first round)
  Christian Süß (third round)
  Ko Lai Chak (third round)
  Robert Gardos (third round)
  Tang Peng (fourth round)
  Adrian Crisan (first round)
  Tan Ruiwu (first round, retired)
  Chiang Peng-Lung (first round)
  Kaii Yoshida (quarterfinals)
  Bastian Steger (second round)
  Zhang Chao (third round)
  Petr Korbel (second round)

Final Rounds

Early Rounds

Section 1

Section 2

Section 3

Section 4

Section 5

Section 6

Section 7

Section 8

References

External links
 

- Mens Singles, 2009 World Table Tennis Championships